First Christian Church is a historic Christian church located at 400 Bridge Street in Sweet Springs, Saline County, Missouri. It was built in 1882–1883, and is a one-story frame building measuring 45 feet by 60 feet.  It is sheathed in weatherboard and features stained glass lancet windows and a two-story, square, bell tower.

It was added to the National Register of Historic Places in 1980.

References

Churches in Missouri
Churches on the National Register of Historic Places in Missouri
Churches completed in 1883
Buildings and structures in Saline County, Missouri
National Register of Historic Places in Saline County, Missouri